Balintore (from the  meaning "The Bleaching Town") is a village near Tain in Easter Ross, Scotland.

It is one of three villages on this northern stretch of the Moray Firth coastline - Hilton, Balintore, and Shandwick are known collectively as the Seaboard Villages. Local employment has long been based on fishing, but this is now only a small part of the local economy.

Balintore has a large harbour, built c.1890. With a shop, post office and pharmacy, Balintore holds a small but friendly community. Balintore always had a very busy village hall which was a meeting point for villagers and consisted of many dances, plays, sales and the occasional whist drive. The previous village hall was knocked down and the land was renovated into the hall we know today which includes a café. The Old Scout Hut has also recently been renovated next to the newly installed play park. On the sea front there is a plaque in commemoration of John Ross (missionary), who was responsible for translation of the Bible into Korean.

Gallery

See also
Balintore F.C.

References

External links

"Seaboard History Website'' - online archive of the social history of the Seaboard Villages; Hilton, Balintore, and Shandwick
"Seaboard Villages Website" 
Down to the Sea - online version of history book of Hilton, Balintore, and Shandwick
Pottery

Populated places in Ross and Cromarty